The 1924 Washington Huskies football team was an American football team that represented the University of Washington during the 1924 college football season. In its fourth season under head coach Enoch Bagshaw, the team compiled an 8–1–1 record, finished in third place in the Pacific Coast Conference, led the nation in scoring  and outscored all opponents by a combined total of 355 to 24. Edwin Kuhn was the team captain. Notable players included halfback Wildcat Wilson and fullback Elmer Tesreau.

Schedule

Game summaries
These game summaries, including the headings in italic, are taken, word-for-word from the Football section of the 1925 Tyee year book.

First Games
"Two weeks after the first call for a turnout, Washington played its first games.  On September 28, defeating West Seattle Athletic Club and the U.S.S. Maryland by scores of 33 to 0 and 32 to 0.

Baggy used his first stringers in the initial game against W.S.A.C and all the reserves in the second tilt.  George Guttormsen's excellent open field work and all around work featured the play."

Willamette

Willamette Game a Walkaway

"Displaying the power and machine-like precision that has been lacking in many a Husky team, Washington sent the Willamette Bearcats home on the short end of a 57 to 0 score on the following Saturday.

Mike Hanley scintillated in the game, dazzling the boys with his ball toting tactics.  He passed and carried the ball brilliantly and finished up a perfect afternoon with a 35-yard drop_kick.

The Bearcats' vaunted defense which had held Oregon to a scoreless tie on the previous Saturday failed to function, Washington making yardage almost at will."

Whitman

Whitman a Cinch

"On October 11, (Coach) Borleske brought his Whitman Wildcats to the Husky lair and saw them soundly trounced, 55 to 0.

Borleske put a light, fast, fighting team of veterans on the field but they were no match for the Husky juggernauts, Tesreau and Wilson."

Montana

Washington, 52; Montana, 7

"Washington completely overwhelmed the Montana Grizzlies on the following Saturday, winning 52 to 7, but a stocky little fellow by the good old Irish name of Kelly completely stole the show.

The sensational Bill Kelly made the Grizzlies lone touchdown on an 85-yard run through the entire Washington team, yodelled signals, did most of the tackling, carried the ball, ran back the punts and hurled passes.

The Husky backfield, despite the absence of Wilson, looked good.  Guttormsen, Shidler, Hanley, Beckett, Tesreau and Parmeter carried the brunt of the attack."

Oregon State

O.A.C. Surprises

"Washington's first surprise came when the fighting Aggies from Corvallis displayed remarkable defensive strength under their own goal posts and were only beaten 6 to 3 on a muddy field.

O.A.C scored first on a place kick by Schulmerich in the first quarter.  Wilson made the only touchdown in the game early in the second frame when he broke through the center of the Aggie's line and twisted and side-stepped his way 67 yards to the goal line.

The Huskies gained at will in midfield, but fumbles and penalties usually proved costly when near the goal line.

Washington fans were given their only view of the huddle system in the game."

Oregon
Oregon Disaster

"Confident of humbling the weak Oregon team Bagshaw assembled his men for their only road trip.  But -- crash, down went the Huskies to a heart-breaking defeat and with it their chances for a championship.

More than one thousand students watched a play-by-play account of the game, telegraphed to the Armory from Eugene.  On the automatic scoreboard they saw how Jones, Oregon fullback, tore large gaps in the Husky line, saw the great Husky backs gain at will in mid-field only to run up against a stone wall when close to the goal line.

At Eugene the field was a virtual quagmire.  Bad breaks, poor headwork and penalties cost Washington the tilt.

Wilson's punt from behind his own goal line struck the cross bar and rebounded over the line.  Mautz, lanky Webfooter end, fell on the ball for what proved to be the winning  score.

Injuries to Kuhn, McRae and Guttormsen, handicapped the team a great deal."

California
The California Game

"Despite the setback at Oregon's hands, the Purple Tornado came back with a zest the next Saturday and fought its way to tie, with the great Golden Bear team from Berkeley. Washington gained a 7 to 7 tie.

But only by looking at the score board could the fans see Washington's even showing against the Berkeley team.  Using the same deceptive spin play which featured their attack on their last showing in the Stadium in 1922, the Bruins forced Washington throughout the entire game on November 8.

A Washington blunder gave its score when a partly blocked punt was recovered by California on the 30-yard line while the Huskies stood watching the ball roll. Had it not been for this lapse of memory Washington might have won that game. Jabs, Bear fullback, bucked the ball over on line plays, and Carlson converted the try-for-point.

Out-played but not out-fought and with but five minutes to go, California holding the ball, McRae recovered a Bruin fumble on the 30-yard line. Lillis was sent in for McRae and received a pass on the first play for a substantial gain. The same play which netted a touchdown in the famous Navy game.  A short pass, Wilson to Guttormsen, netted more yardage. George Wilson then got away to a 27-yard run on a crisscross around the right end to the 12-yard line. Here the Bears held and on the fourth down with seven yards to go, Wilson tossed a well masked pass to the fleet footed Guttormsen who carried the ball over for a touchdown.

With one minute to go, and a chance to tie the score, Harold Shidler went in to convert the try-for-point. He did so to the satisfaction of thirty thousand howling fans.

Tut Imlay's splendid open field running and Captain Horrell's line playing stood out for California.

Harold Patton, Wilson and Tesreau played great ball throughout the game.

California showed a superior set of wingmen, Guttormsen being downed in his track repeatedly."

Puget Sound
Huge Score for Camp

"The next week, before the eyes of Walter Camp, football sage of New Haven, George Wilson led his team in a scoring orgy against the College of Puget Sound. The final score was 96 to 0, incidentally the largest score of the western grid season.

Coach Bagshaw used every man that had made the trip.

Camp liked the way Harold Shidler, Tesreau and Patton performed. Tesreau's defensive work stood out."

Washington State
Win Over Traditional Rivals

"George Wilson, Bagshaw's great All-American back was the spark plug of a driving attack that carried the Huskies to a 14 to 0 victory over their traditional rivals from Pullman in the final game of the season on November 22.

The highly touted Cougar offense failed to materialize against the Huskies. Koenig, Exendine's brilliant Eskimo halfback, gave the fans a thrill several times by his passing and ball running, putting his teammates in a position to score twice.

Wilson contributed largely toward Washington's first score when he crashed off right tackle 49 yards to the one yard mark. Tesreau carried it over and Guttormsen converted. Wilson, Tesreau and Patton bucked the ball for the length of the field for the final score.

Captain Kuhn, Bellman, Dubois, Westrom, Seivers and Walters, played remarkable ball in their final college game."

References

Washington
Washington Huskies football seasons
Washington Huskies football